The 1925 Texas A&M Aggies football team was an American football team that represented Texas A&M University in the Southwest Conference (SWC) during the 1925 college football season. In its eighth season under head coach Dana X. Bible, the team compiled a 7–1–1 record (4–1 against SWC opponents), won the conference championship, shut out five opponents, and outscored all opponents by a total of 191 to 25.

Schedule

References

Texas AandM
Texas A&M Aggies football seasons
Southwest Conference football champion seasons
Texas AandM